D. Ravikumar (born 1961) is an Indian Tamil intellectual, writer, lawyer politician and an anti-caste activist. He was the editor of the magazine, Nirapirikai. Nirapirikai inspired several new writers in the 1990s in Tamil Nadu. He is an Ambedkarite. Ravikumar is the current Member of Parliament in the Lok Sabha from Viluppuram and member of the Dravida Munnetra Kazhagam.

Career
Ravikumar is the founder of the anti-caste publishing house Navayana, along with S. Anand, and the former president of the People's Education Movement (Makkal Kalvi Eyakkam) and PUCL (Tamil Nadu and Pondicherry).

Ravikumar was elected to the Tamil Nadu Legislative Assembly from Kattumannarkoil, Cuddalore district, and served from 2006 to 2011. He was instrumental in bringing a new policy to handle EWaste in Tamil Nadu. The Tamil Nadu government started a skill development program and Kalaignar M. Karunanidhi, then Chief Minister of Tamil Nadu, created six welfare boards, both at the request of Ravikumar.

In 2010, Ravikumar won the Aringar Anna Award, conferred by the Tamil Nadu Government. Vikatan Awards for Translation ( 2014) Thiranayvu chemmal award for literary criticism (2019) manonmaniam Sundaranar University, Bharathi Award (2019) Vitiyal Trust Chennai.

Positions held 
Syndicate Member, Tamil University
Senate Member, Annamalai University
Member, Enperayam, Central Institute of Classical Tamil
Member, Social Reforms Committee, Tamil Nadu Government
Member, Puthirai Vannar Welfare Board, Tamil Nadu Government
Member of Legislative Assemby, Kattumannarkoil constituency, Tamilnadu (2006 - 2011)
Member of Parliament, Lok Sabha (2019-Incumbent), Vilupuram Loksabha Constituency

Writings

Books

Prose
"Kankanippin Arasiyal" (1995) Vidiyal Pathippagam 
"Kothippu Uyarndu Varum" (2001) Kalachuvadu 
"Kadakka Mudiyatha Nizhal" (2003) Kalachuvadu
"Malcolm X" (2003) Kalachuvadu
"Sonnal Mudiyum" (2007) Vikatan Publication
"Indrum Namadhe" (2008) Vikatan Publication 
"Thuyarathin mel patiyum Thuyaram" (2009) Aazhi Publication 
"Thamizharay Unarum Tharunam" (2010) Aazhi Publication
"Kaana Mutiyaa Kanavu" (2010) Aazhi Publication 
"Bob Marley" (2010) Uyirmai Publication
"Andai Ayal Ulakam" (2010) Uyirmai Publication 
"Piravazhip payanam" (2010) Uyirmai Publication
"Katranaiththoorum" (2010) Uyirmai Publication
"Soolakam" (2010) Uyirmai Publication
"Meelum Varalaru" (2010) Ulakath Thamizaraychi niruvanam  
"Kumbatchiyilirunthu kodungonmaikku" (2017) Kizhakku Pathipakam
"Kaalathai Thorkaditha Kalaingar" (2017) Manarkeni
Kaanalaay marum kaveri (2018) Manarkeni 
Ayiram Pookkal Karukattum (2019) Manarkeni

Poetry
"Avizhum Sorkal" (2009) Uyirmai
"Mazhai Maram" (2009) CreA
"Vaanil Vitterintha Kanavu" (2017) Manarkeni

Short Stories
"Kadal Kinaru" (2014) Manarkeni

Translations
Uraiyadal Thodarkiradu (1995) (interviews and articles of philosophers including Michel Foucault, Edward Said) Vidiyal Pathipakam
Choli ke peche (2010) (short stories of women writers including Mahasweta Devi, Ismat Chuktai, Isabelle Allende) Aazhi
Velichamum Thanneer Mathiritan (2003) (short stories of Gabriel Garcia Marquez and others) Dalit Veliyeedu
Athikarathitam Unmaiyaip Pesuthal (2010) (writings of Edward Said) Manarkeni
Varalaru Ennum Kathai (2010) (writings of Eduardo Galeano) Manarkeni
Valasaip Paravai (2010) (poems of Yehuda Amichai, Maya Angelou, Ethelbert Miller, Joy Goswami and others) Manarkeni

Editing

Tamil
Dalit Literature, Politics, Culture (1996)  
Dalit Engira Thanitthuvum (1998) Dalit Publication  
Iyothee Thaas Panditar Cintanaikal (four volumes) (1999) Dalit Sahitya Academy  
Rettaimalai Srinivasan Jeevida Carithira Curukkam (1999) (Autobiography) Dalit Sahitya Academy 
Mikai Naadum Kalai (2003) (Essays on cinema) kalachuvadu 
Dalit journal
Bodhi journal
Manarkeni journal

English
We, the Condemned (1999) (Against Death Penalty) PUCL, Pondicherry

References

Further reading 
 Satyanarayana, K & Tharu, Susie (2013) From those Stubs Steel Nibs are Sprouting: New Dalit Writing from South Asia, Dossier 2: Kannada and Telugu, New Delhi: HarperCollins India.

21st-century Indian non-fiction writers
Tamil writers
Living people
1961 births
Activists from Tamil Nadu
Viduthalai Chiruthaigal Katchi politicians
Writers from Tamil Nadu
Dalit writers
Indian social sciences writers
Dalit activists
India MPs 2019–present
Dalit politicians
21st-century Indian lawyers
20th-century Indian lawyers
20th-century Indian politicians
20th-century Indian writers